Edward Dickson may refer to:

 Edward Dickson (Canadian politician) (1854–1903), merchant and politician in Manitoba, Canada
 Edward Thompson Dickson (1850–1938), British Army officer
 Edward Stirling Dickson (1765–1844), Royal Navy admiral
 Edward Augustus Dickson (1879–1956), American educator
 Ed Dickson (born 1987), American football player
 Ted Dickson, UK champion greyhound trainer

See also
Edward Dixon (disambiguation)